Arome Bigabwa (born 30 March 1952) is a Congolese politician and Member of the National Assembly of the Democratic Republic of the Congo.

References

1952 births
Living people
Members of the National Assembly (Democratic Republic of the Congo)
Union for the Congolese Nation politicians
21st-century Democratic Republic of the Congo people